Hemerophila was also erroneously used by Fernald in 1900 for the related genus Choreutis.

Hemerophila is a genus of moths in the family Choreutidae. A number of species was recently transferred to the genus Ornarantia.

Species

Hemerophila albertiana (Cramer, 1781)
Hemerophila arcigera (Felder & Rogenhofer, 1875)
Hemerophila diva (Riley, 1889)
Hemerophila felis Walsingham, 1914
Hemerophila houttuinialis (Cramer, 1782)
Hemerophila milliaria (Meyrick, 1922)
Hemerophila musicosema (Meyrick, 1926)
Hemerophila orinympha (Meyrick, 1926)
Hemerophila triacmias (Meyrick, 1926)

Former species

Hemerophila biferana (Walker, 1863)
Hemerophila bigerana (Walker, 1863)
Hemerophila canofusana (Walker, 1863)
Hemerophila chorica (Meyrick, 1926)
Hemerophila cinctipes (Felder & Rogenhofer, 1875)
Hemerophila contrariana (Walker, 1863)
Hemerophila contubernalis (Zeller, 1877)
Hemerophila dyari Busck, 1900
Hemerophila gradella Walsingham, 1914
Hemerophila immarginata Walsingham, 1914
Hemerophila laciniosella Busck, 1914
Hemerophila merratella Busck, 1914
Hemerophila ophiodesma (Meyrick, 1915)
Hemerophila rimulalis (Zeller, 1875)
Hemerophila scenophora (Meyrick, 1922)
Hemerophila tristis (Felder & Rogenhofer, 1875)
Hemerophila velatana (Walker, 1863)
Hemerophila xutholopa Walsingham, 1914

External links
choreutidae.lifedesks.org
Hemerophila at funet

Choreutidae